Bullwinkle J. Moose is a fictional character and one of the two main protagonists of the 1959–1964 ABC network animated television series Rocky and His Friends and The Bullwinkle Show, often collectively referred to as Rocky and Bullwinkle, produced by Jay Ward and Bill Scott. When the show changed networks in 1961, the series moved to NBC and was retitled The Bullwinkle Show, where it stayed until 1964. It then returned to ABC, where it was in repeats for nine more years. It has been in syndication ever since.

In 1996, Bullwinkle was ranked #32 on TV Guides 50 Greatest TV Stars of All Time.

Creation 
Jay Ward and his business partner Alex Anderson created Bullwinkle for The Frostbite Falls Review, a storyboard idea which was never developed into a series. They gave him the name "Bullwinkle Jay Moose" after Clarence Bullwinkel, who owned a Ford dealership at College and Claremont, in Oakland, California,  because they thought it was a funny name. Both Bullwinkle and Rocky were given the middle initial "J" in reference to Jay Ward.

From his debut along with Rocky, Bullwinkle's gloves were blue. Later in the second story arc and for the rest of the series, they become white. Also, in contemporary promotion art, Bullwinkle's antlers are a yellow in contrast to the rest of his body; originally they were brown.

Biography 
Bullwinkle shared a house with his best friend Rocket J. Squirrel in the fictional small town of Frostbite Falls, Minnesota, a spoof of the real-life American town of International Falls, Minnesota. Bullwinkle attended college at "Wossamotta U" (a play on "What's the matter with you") on a football scholarship. He is a long-time supporter of the Bull Moose Party, and at one time was the part-owner, part-governor of the island of Moosylvania. Bullwinkle is shown at numerous times to be quite wealthy. In seasons 1 and 2, he makes reference to having an Uncle Dewlap, who bequeathed Bullwinkle vast amounts of wealth (in the form of a cereal boxtop collection and an Upsidaisium mine); he also has a large petty cash stockpile hidden in his mattress that he accumulated delivering newspapers (as revealed in "The Last Angry Moose"). In the half-cartoon, half-live-action movie The Adventures of Rocky and Bullwinkle, Bullwinkle receives an Honorary Mooster's Degree from Wossamotta U, due to the nefarious plans of Boris Badenov.

Personality 
Bullwinkle was noted for being well-intentioned, but also quite foolish, which made for a source of jokes and plot devices during the show's run. Despite this, the so-called "moronic moose" often aided the brains of the "moose-and-squirrel" duo, Rocky, during their various adventures. Although on opposite ends of the I.Q. scale, he and the "plucky squirrel" had a shared sense of optimism, persistence and traditional ethics and moral standards. Although not as brainy as Rocky, Bullwinkle often made references breaking the fourth wall, so he was not always as clueless as he appeared. His apparent lack of brilliance also had positive side effects, making him immune to mind-numbing chemicals in "Goof Gas Attack" and being the only person able to properly handle the Kirwood Derby hat in "Missouri Mish Mash". His voice is nasally, with a slight lisp added.

Bullwinkle also hosted other segments of the program, including: "Mr. Know-It-All," where he tried to demonstrate his supposed (albeit nonexistent) expertise on a variety of subjects, such as disarming bombs, curing hiccups or escaping from Devil's Island; "Bullwinkle's Corner", where the moose would attempt to read poetry, notably "I Wandered Lonely as a Cloud" (The Daffodils) of William Wordsworth; and various interstitial drop-ins. In one running gag, Bullwinkle would attempt to pull a rabbit out of a top hat (to Rocky's dismissal: "Again?" or "But that trick never works.", and Bullwinkle's canonical rejoinder, "Nothing up my sleeve...Presto." or "This time, for sure. Presto."), only to pull out something unexpected instead such as a lion, tiger, bear, rhinoceros and occasionally even Rocky himself. After each failed attempt, Rocky segued to a commercial by saying, "Now, here's something we hope you'll really like."

Voice 
Bill Scott, Ward's partner and head writer of the series, was the original voice of Bullwinkle. According to Scott, Ward simply assumed that Scott would play the role. In the 2000 Universal Pictures film The Adventures of Rocky and Bullwinkle, Bullwinkle is voiced by Keith Scott (no relation to Bill), as Bill had died of a heart attack in 1985. At the time, he had finished the first season of voicing another Moose character, Moosel, for The Wuzzles. Bullwinkle was voiced by Tom Kenny for the short film Rocky and Bullwinkle, which was to be premiered with Mr. Peabody & Sherman, but the short was cancelled and was replaced with an alien-themed short called Almost Home, based on the then-upcoming film from DreamWorks, Home. However, the short is available in both 2D and 3D on the Blu-ray 3D disc of Mr. Peabody & Sherman. Kenny also voiced Bullwinkle in a GEICO commercial on the same year to promote the short. In the 2018 Amazon Video series The Adventures of Rocky and Bullwinkle, Bullwinkle was voiced by Brad Norman.

References

External Links 
Hokey Smoke! Rocky and Bullwinkle
My Native Land Sir Walter Scott poem with Bullwinkle voice impression
https://cdm15889.contentdm.oclc.org/digital/collection/p15889coll2/id/3543

Fictional deer and moose
 Bullwinkle J. Moose
Anthropomorphic mammals
Fictional players of American football
Fictional characters from Minnesota
Fictional characters with superhuman strength
Comedy film characters
Television characters introduced in 1959
Fictional secret agents and spies
Fictional police detectives
Male characters in animation
Animated characters introduced in 1959